Michael Moynihan (17 June 1917 – 27 June 2001) was an Irish Labour Party politician who served as Minister of State at the Department of Trade, Commerce and Tourism from 1982 to 1987. He served as a Senator for the Industrial and Commercial Panel from 1973 to 1982 and as a Teachta Dála for the Kerry South constituency from 1981 to 1987 and 1989 to 1992.

Moynihan was born in Kinsale, County Cork, in 1917. He was a psychiatric nurse by profession. He was elected in 1973 to the 13th Seanad as a Senator for the Industrial and Commercial Panel, which re-elected him in 1977 to the 14th Seanad.

He was elected to the 22nd Dáil at the 1981 general election, becoming the first ever Labour Party TD for Kerry South, and returned to the 23rd Dáil at the February 1982 general election. He was re-elected at the November 1982 general election, sitting in the 24th Dáil. He served as Minister of State at the Department of Trade, Commerce and Tourism from 1982 to 1987.

Moynihan was defeated at the 1987 general election, but returned at the 1989 general election to sit in the 26th Dáil. He did not stand at the 1992 general election, when his seat was retained for the Labour Party by his daughter Breeda Moynihan-Cronin.

See also
Families in the Oireachtas

References

1917 births
2001 deaths
Labour Party (Ireland) TDs
Politicians from County Kerry
Members of the 13th Seanad
Members of the 14th Seanad
Members of the 22nd Dáil
Members of the 23rd Dáil
Members of the 24th Dáil
Members of the 26th Dáil
Ministers of State of the 24th Dáil
Labour Party (Ireland) senators